The following is a list of Palestinian dishes and drinks. For the cuisine, see Palestinian cuisine (Arabic: الطعام الفلسطيني).

The cultural and linguistic heritage of the Palestinian people is a blend of both indigenous Canaanite, and the Phoenician elements and the foreign cultures that have come to rule the land and its people over the course of thousands of years

Main dishes by region

Galilee

Kebab halabi—kebab served with a spicy tomato sauce and Aleppo pepper
Kibbeh 
Kibbee bi-siniyyeh—
Kibbeh nayyeh—
Mansaf
Maqluba—an "upside-down" dish, made with fried vegetables, meat (lamb), rice and eggplant
Musakhan—large taboon bread topped with sumac, and onions
Ruz wa Lahme ma' Laban—mix of rice and lamb topped with a mildly spicy yogurt
Shish taouk—chicken pieces on skewers

West Bank

Fasoulya beyda—white beans cooked in tomato sauce and served with rice
Fasoulya khadra—green beans cooked in tomato sauce and served with rice
Kafta b'thine—kafta balls cooked with tahini sauce and served with rice
Kafta harra—kafta cooked in tomato sauce with potatoes, eaten alone or in pita bread
Mahshi lift—a specialty of Hebron, turnips stuffed with rice, minced lamb meat and spices, cooked in tamarind sauce
Mandi or Ruz ma lahma—in the West Bank, made by cooking meat, rice and vegetables in a taboon, as in other Arab States
Mansaf—lamb cooked in a sauce of fermented dried yogurt and served with rice or bulgur
Maqluba—an "upside-down" dish, made with fried vegetables, meat (chicken/lamb) and rice
Musakhan—large taboon bread topped with sumac, onions and peppers
Zarb—same as mandi, but cooked under high pressure in an airtight oven, and usually rice is substituted by bread (influenced by Jordanians)

Gaza

Fukharit 'adas—lentil flavored with red peppers, dill, garlic and cumin
Maqluba—upside-down eggplant, rice, meat and cauliflower casserole
Qidra—rice and meat pieces cooked with cloves, garlic and cardamom
Rummaniyya—a mix of eggplant, pomegranate seeds, tahina, red peppers and garlic
Sumaghiyyeh—beef and chickpea stew flavored with sumac, tahina and red peppers
Zibdieh—a clay-pot dish of shrimp baked in a stew of olive oil, garlic, hot peppers, and peeled tomatoes

National

Ari'ih—rice and minced meat stuffed in pumpkins
Bamia—okra cooked with tomato sauce and onions
Falafel—fried hummus, spice and parsley ball or patty
Fatta—dishes that include bread crumbs
 Hummus—a dip, spread, or savory dish made from cooked, mashed chickpeas blended with tahini, lemon juice, and garlic
Kousa mahshi—rice and minced meat stuffed in zucchini
Maftul—large couscous-like balls, garbanzo beans and chicken pieces cooked in chicken broth
Malfuf—rice and minced meat rolled in cabbage leaves
Maqluba—upside-down eggplant, rice, meat and cauliflower casserole
Mloukiyyeh—Corchorus stew
Mujaddara—lentil and bulgur casserole
Musakhan—large taboon breads with chicken, onions, sumac, and allspice
Shawarma—a dish consisting of meat cut into thin slices, stacked in a cone-like shape, and roasted on a slowly-turning vertical rotisserie or spit
Shurbat freekeh—green wheat soup, usually with chicken
Waraq al-'anib—rice and minced meats rolled in grape leaves

Side dishes

Salads and dips 

Arabic salad—made of tomato, cucumber, onion, olive oil and lemon juice, Palestinian variant called Salatat al-bundura ("tomato salad")
Baba ghanoush—aubergine (eggplant) salad
Hummus—ground chickpeas with tahina and olive oil
Fattoush—mixed leaf-vegetable salad with deep-fried pita bread pieces and sumac
Ful medames—ground fava beans and olive oil
 Galayet bandora—a simple dish of tomatoes, onions, hot peppers, olive oil, and salt served for breakfast, lunch, or dinner
 Malfouf salad—typically consists of shredded cabbage, lemon juice, olive oil, garlic, salt and dried mint
 Mfarakeh—a dish made of potato, egg, ghee, cumin powder, salt and pepper, in addition chopped coriander leaf for garnish
Mutabbel—spicier version of baba ghanoush
Tabbouleh—parsley and bulgur salad with diced tomatoes, onions and lemon juice
Tahini—condiment made from toasted ground hulled sesame seeds

Cheeses and yogurts

Akkawi—a white brine cheese originating from the city of Akka, Palestine*
Halloumi—cheese with a high melting point which can easily be fried or grilled, making it a popular meat substitute
Jibneh Arabieh—has a mild taste similar to feta but less salty
Jameed—a hard dry laban made from ewe or goat's milk, kept in a fine woven cheesecloth to make a thick yogurt
Kashk—made from drained yogurt or drained sour milk by shaping it and letting it dry
Labeneh—tangy, thick, creamy yogurt cheese
Nabulsi—can be eaten fresh as salty table cheese or can be fried in oil

Breads

Ka'ak—may refer to a bread commonly consumed throughout the Near East that is made in a large ring-shape and is covered with sesame seeds
Khubz—may refer to any type of bread. Breads popular in Arab countries include "pocket" pita bread and tandoor bread. The oldest known find of bread, by archaeologists in Northern Jordan, dates back 14,000 years
Pita—a family of yeast-leavened round flatbreads baked from wheat flour, common in the Mediterranean, Middle East, and neighboring areas
Markook—unleavened and usually made with only flour, water, and salt, and after being rested and divided into round portions, flattened and spread across a round cushion until it is thin then flipped onto the saj
Taboon—an important part of Palestinian cuisine, traditionally baked on a bed of small hot stones in the taboon oven

Bread dishes

Fatayer—a meat pie that can be stuffed with spinach, or cheese such as feta or Akkawi, and za'atar
Manakish—taboon bread topped with za'atar and olive oil
Sambusak—fried dough balls stuffed with meat, pine nuts and onions
Sfiha—flatbread topped with beef and red peppers
Shawarma—pita bread roll of meat, tahini and various vegetables

Condiments
 Bahārāt (بَهَارَات)—Arabic word for "spices" (plural of bahār "spice")
 Duqqa (دُقَّة)—a condiment consisting of a mixture of herbs, nuts (usually hazelnut), and spices
 Qizha (قزحة)—made from crushed nigella seeds, the paste has a sharp, bitter taste with slight tones of sweetness
 Sumac (السماق)—ground into a reddish-purple powder used as a spice in Middle-Eastern cuisine to add a tart, lemony taste to salads or meat
 Za'atar (زَعْتَر)—a spice mixture that includes the herb along with toasted sesame seeds, dried sumac, and often salt and other spices

Beverages

Arabic coffee—a version of the brewed coffee of Coffea arabica (بُنّ) beans
Arak (ﻋﺮﻕ)—Anise-flavored alcoholic beverage
 Helba (حلبه)—Fenugreek beverage
Kharroub (خَرُّوبٌ)—carob juice
Lemonade (عصير الليمون)—a sweetened lemon-flavoured beverage
 Qamar Eddine (قمر الدين)—an apricot juice or nectar beverage that is typically consumed during the Muslim holy month of Ramadan
 Sahlab (سَحْلَب)—boiled milk with starch made from nearly-extinct orchids, covered with smashed coconut and cinnamon
Tamar Al-Hindi (تمر هندي)—a refreshing cold sweet-and-sour Ramadan drink prepared with tamarind, sugar and water
Turkish coffee (قهوة تركية)—a style of coffee prepared using very finely ground coffee beans without filtering
 Zanjabeel (زنجبيل)—a simple ginger tea

Sweets

 Awameh (عوامة)—Arabic for "swimmer", a Levantine pastry similar to doughnut holes, made of deep-fried dough, soaked in sugar syrup or honey and cinnamon, sometimes sprinkled with sesame
Baklava (البقلاوة)—sweet pastry made of layers of filo
Batata b'kaak (فطيرة البطاطس)—potato pancake
 Ghoriba (غريبة)—a shortbread biscuit, usually made with ground almonds
 Halawa (حلوى‎)—primary ingredients are tahini and sugar, glucose or honey
Harīsa (هريسة)—a traditional semolina sweet cake  drenched in rose water
Kanafeh (كُنافة)—cheese pastry soaked in sweet sugar-based syrup
Ma'amoul (معمول)—shortbread pastries filled with dates, pistachios or walnuts
 Maftoul (مفتول)—small steamed balls of crushed durum wheat semolina usually served with a stew spooned on top
 Meshabek (مشبك مصري)—Egyptian funnel cake
 Muhallebi (مهلبية)—a milk pudding, basic ingredients are rice, sugar, rice flour and milk
Qatayef (قطايف)—sweet dumpling filled with cream or nuts
 Saḥlab (سَحْلَب)—a flour made from the tubers of some near-extinct species of the orchid genus Orchis, used to make mucilaginous hot drinks and desserts; now many instant sahlab mixes are made with artificial flavoring since the true form is illegal
 She'reyabil haleeb (شعريه)—rice vermicelli in milk, very similar to rice pudding, but with less milk
 Warbat (وربات)—a sweet pastry similar to baklava, with layers of thin phyllo dough filled with custard

See also

References

Lists of foods by nationality

Dishes